Fatmagül'ün Suçu Ne? ( What is Fatmagül's Fault? or "What Did Fatmagul Wrong?") is a Turkish television drama series produced by Ay Yapım and broadcast on Kanal D. The series is based on Vedat Türkali's scenario, Fatmagül'ün Suçu Ne?, which was made into a film in 1986, Hülya Avşar as Fatmagül. The series is written by the duo Ece Yörenç and Melek Gençoğlu. The soundtrack was composed and conducted by Toygar Işıklı. It tells the story of a poor gang-raped woman who does not stop seeking justice after she is forced into marriage with one of her rapists.

Plot
Fatmagül Ketenci (Beren Saat) is a lower-class dairy-farm naïve girl who lives in the village Ildır on the Aegean coast belonging to the administrative district of Çeşme, in Izmir province, with her too simple brother Rahmi (Bülent Seyran), his son and his wife Mukaddes (Esra Dermancıoğlu) who hates her for no reason. Fatmagül plans to marry her childhood love Mustafa (Fırat Çelik), a fisherman. They are only waiting for Mustafa to earn much money to finish their house construction before marriage. Then there is the Yaşaran family, the rich upper-class businessmen and their political social elites. Yaşaran Family is in Izmir for the engagement ceremony of the son of the elder brother Reşat Yaşaran (Musa Uzunlar) to the daughter of a politician. Selim (Engin Öztürk) is his son and Erdoğan (Kaan Taşaner) his nephew. These cousins have a third friend Vural (Buğra Gülsoy) who also belongs to the upper-class. All these three have spent their childhood in Izmir but as the businesses of their fathers grew, they moved to Istanbul. They have a childhood friend in Izmir, whom they meet on yearly basis when they come there for summer vacations. This fourth friend of theirs is the hero - Kerim Ilgaz (Engin Akyürek).

Kerim Ilgaz is a well-mannered boy, a blacksmith apprentice by profession, who lives with his aunt Meryem Aksoy (Sumru Yavrucuk), known affectionately as "Ebe Nine", who is a homeopath. Kerim was orphaned during childhood so Meryem brought him up as her own son. He works as a carpenter in the workshop of his father's friend. Kerim though unlike his rich friends, is over-powered by their presence. He considers himself important with them and hence, enjoys their company.

Fatmagül is desperate to be married-off to Mustafa, not only because she loves him but also to get rid away from her nagging sister-in-law. Her desire for Mustafa and an independent married life is growing with time as Mukaddes's hatred is growing towards her. Except for Mustafa, she has no one to share her feelings with. While in Izmir, Erdoğan, Selim, Vural and Kerim see Fatmagül and the three rich men ogle and tease her. Kerim doesn't like this. Then at Selim's engagement, Kerim comes face-to-face with her as she is working there with her sister-in-law.

The big event of the season is the engagement of Selim, to the politician Turaner Alagöz's (Aziz Sarvan) daughter Meltem (Seda Güven). Kerim after attending Selim's engagement, joins his friends for an after-party. All four go for drinking and drug binge near the sea. Mustafa is leaving for a night fish-catch. Fatmagül is coming to see him off. She passes from the area where the drunk boys are singing. Kerim sees her and on recognizing her shouts to his friends 'Guys! It's the same girl'!! Then when she tries to run, Kerim gets hold of her while the other three come near her.

The tragedy occurs. Fatmagül is gang-raped. The four boys are shown to be involved in the crime as she faints when Kerim comes on her. The next morning, a traumatized Fatmagül is discovered by Ebe Nine while she is picking herbs. The four boys have already left the crime scene. Kerim drops off Selim and Erdoğan at their place and himself goes with Vural to his house. Kerim is left deeply disturbed by the event and is even more distressed to know that the girl has been rescued by his mother. The rich boys are confident in the power of their rich fathers and are sure to be saved. As Mukaddes approaches the Yaşarans threatening of giving their name to the police (as she had found Selim's engagement ring at the rape-scene), with the course of events, the Yaşarans save their sons and forcefully marry Kerim to Fatmagül. Kerim accepts the blame of solely raping Fatmagül for protecting his friends and also because he believes himself to be guilty. Mukaddes is their accomplice in all this. Mustafa is hurt primarily because of his fiance being raped. He burns their half-finished house in front of Fatmagül because he believes Yaşaran's false stories that Fatmagül has been having an affair with Kerim from the beginning. Fatmagül and Kerim's families sell their properties and move to İstanbul to start a new life.

The story develops in Istanbul. Fatmagül hates Kerim. She insults him, abuses him, spits at him, tries to kill him, etc. Kerim is not sure whether he really raped her, as he was drunk and drugged. But Fatmagül believes that he did it as his was the last face she saw before fainting. Then Vural who is having little traumas of guilt, tells Kerim what he knows that; Kerim did not rape Fatmagül. In fact, when she laid there and fainted, he just sat beside her. Kerim tells this to Fatmagül. She believes it but it is of no importance for her as she hates him and considers him as much as culprit as the other three.

Things become complicated due to the exploitations of the Yaşarans and their unscrupulous lawyer, Münir Telci (Murat Daltaban), who wants to protect them, as well as Mustafa, who seeks revenge on Kerim. As a result, both the Yaşarans and Mustafa start harassing Kerim, Fatmagül and their relatives. Kerim, realizing his presence causes Fatmagül a lot of pain, prepares to leave and divorce her as she desires. Just before he leaves, Kerim realizes that he loves Fatmagül, and that it was love at first sight. He writes a letter to her, telling her to move on in her life and that one day he will come and ask for forgiveness from her.

Fatmagül reads this letter. Later-on the viewers are shown that this was the moment when Fatmagül fell in love with Kerim as his words softened her heart for him and she believed him. Kerim returns and Fatmagül gradually begins to trust him more.

One day, Vural overhears Erdoğan's plan to get rid of Mustafa and Kerim forever. He requests a meeting with Kerim to warn him. Fatmagül, on a passing bus, sees Vural hug Kerim goodbye and her trust in Kerim dissolves. She believes he is still conspiring with her rapists. In order to prove his innocence and love for her, Kerim files her rape case and asks the police to arrest him, Vural and the Yaşarans, after which Fatmagül finally accepts his of being honest with her. Mustafa finds out the truth and asks Fatmagül to forgive him, but she rejects him. The Yaşarans bribe Mustafa to not divulge the truth to the police and he becomes a greedy co-conspirator in the Yaşarans' attempts to obstruct justice. During the first trial, the Yaşarans falsify their testimonies. They also resort to using several bribed witnesses. Vural then is accidentally killed by Mustafa.

In the second season, Fatmagül also confesses her love for Kerim. After the Yaşarans forcefully protect Mustafa against Fatmagül, he abducts her, stating he loves her more than Kerim and that he regrets leaving her. Kerim eventually rescues his wife and they escape. Mustafa is arrested and imprisoned for his crimes. At the wedding of Kerim and Fatmagül, Mustafa intentionally tries to escape from police custody and is therefore, shot to death. Meanwhile, Selim and Erdoğan surreptitiously move to Malta where they briefly hide from the authorities. However, they are extradited to Istanbul after Erdoğan engages in a fight at a nightclub and is arrested.

Eventually, Fatmagül confronts them in court and they are charged for their part in her rape, essentially bringing down the Yaşaran empire. The series ends with Fatmagül and Kerim expecting their first child. In the final scene, they walk down the street in Izmir holding hands, expressing that their love cannot be shaken despite the difficult challenges they faced and that when a woman is strong like Fatmagül and has the support of a strong husband like Kerim, even a crime like 'rape' cannot escape justice.

Characters

Series overview

International broadcasts
Fatmagül gained a lot of popularity in Turkey, India, Bangladesh, Pakistan, Azerbaijan, Iran, Arabic countries and many other countries all around the world.It also dubbed in many languages notably Persian.
  on Deepto TV with the title  ফাতমাগুল  (Fatmagul) 
  on Zee Zindagi with the title of Fatmagul 
  on Urdu 1 with the title of فاطمہ گل - آخر میرا قصور کیا؟ (Fatma gul - After all what is my fault?)
  on Albanian Screen with the title Fatmagyl
  on BHT1 with the title Izgubljena čast
  on Viva with the title פטמגול (Fatmagul)
  Saudi Arabia on MBC4 With the title فاطمة (Fatma)
  Arab World on Fox with the title فاطمة (Fatma)
  on Tolo TV with the title Fatima Gul
  on BTV, BTV Lady with the title Пепел от рози (in English: Ashes of Roses)
  on Nova TV with the title Izgubljena čast (Lost Honor)
  on Prva TV with the title Izgubljena čast (Lost Honor)
  on TV Vijesti with the title Izgubljena čast (Lost Honor)
  on TV5Monde with the title Fatmagul
  on Imedi TV with the title უდანაშაულო
  on Mega Channel with the title Fatmagul
  on RTV21 with the title Fatmagyl
  on GEM/River with the title فاطماگل
  on LBCI with the title Fatma
  on Nova with the title Fatmagul
  on STS "Без вины виноватая" (Guilty Without Guilt)
  on Turkish Dramas with the title "What is Fatmagul's Fault?"
  on ANTV with the title Fatmagul
  on medi 1 With the title فاطمة (Fatma)
  on Sitel TV with the title Судбината на Фатмаѓул (Fatmagul destiny)
  on Kanal 2 with the title Süütu süüdlane (Innocent Culprit)
  on 1+1 "У чому вина Фатмагюль?" (Where is Fatmagul fault?)
  on TV Doma with the title Fatmagul
  on LNK with the title Be kaltės kalta (Guilty Without Guilt)
  on Mega with the title ¿Qué culpa tiene Fatmagül? (What is Fatmagul's Fault?)
  on Telefé with the title ¿Qué culpa tiene Fatmagül? (What is Fatmagul's Fault?)
  on Planet TV with the title Fatmagul
  on Frecuencia Latina with the title ¿Qué culpa tiene Fatmagül? (What is Fatmagul's Fault?)
  on Prima Love with the title Krásná fatmagul (Beautiful Fatmagul)
  on Rede Bandeirantes with the title Fatmagül - A Força do Amor
  on Kana TV with the title ቅጣት
  on WAPA-TV and Telemundo PR with the title ¿Qué culpa tiene Fatmagül? (What is Fatmagul's Fault?)
 on Canal 5 with the title ¿Qué culpa tiene Fatmagül? (What is Fatmagul's Fault?)
  on Kanal D with the title Fatmagül
  on TV2 with the title Fatmagül
  on TVP 1 with the title Grzech Fatmagül 
 South Africa on  eExtra with the title  FATMAGÜL in English dubbed

  on Univision with the title Qué culpa tiene Fatmagül?

Reception

Iran and Afghanistan
Turkish television drama is popular in Iran, where they are dubbed into Persian. The song "Roozhaye Tanhaei" by Iranian singer Ava Bahram has been prepared and performed for the title track of the series Fatmagul. The most popular Turkish show is Fatmagül'ün Suçu Ne?.

Southeastern Europe
In Kosovo, the most popular TV shows in December 2012 were Fatmagül'ün Suçu Ne?, which ranked top of all programmes and Aşk ve Ceza (Love and Punishment), which came in third according to data by Index Kosova. In Serbia, research from January 2013 indicates that the top two Turkish shows in TV were Muhteşem Yüzyıl, which ranked fourth, and Öyle Bir Geçer Zaman Ki (As Time Goes By), which came in seventh. Fatmagul was one of the most popular shows in Macedonia which irked the government to pass a bill to restrict broadcasts of Turkish series during the day and at prime time in order to reduce the Turkish impact on Macedonian society.

Bangladesh
The Bangla dubbed version of Fatmagul was broadcast on Deepto TV in June 2019. It became one of the most popular Turkish series in Bangladesh.

Ethiopia

Fatmagül'ün Suçu Ne? was well received by Ethiopians due to the popularity of other Turkish dramas that had been previously shown in Ethiopia. Fatmagül'ün Suçu Ne? was dubbed in Amharic with title "ቅጣት" or "kitat" and aired on Kana TV.

Pakistan
Fatmagül'ün Suçu Ne? was the second most popular Turkish series in Pakistan which was ranked top in 2013 above Pakistani shows like Zindagi Gulzar Hai, Kankar and Aunn Zara. The series averaged 16% TV ratings with the viewership above 25 million in Pakistani urban and rural market. Aşk-ı Memnu, was the highest rated Turkish series which broke all records in 2012.

Arab world
In 2013, the most popular Turkish shows worldwide were Fatmagül'ün Suçu Ne?, Aşk-ı Memnu and Muhteşem Yüzyıl. Fatmagül'ün Suçu Ne? has increased the popularity of Istanbul as a tourist destination among Arabs. With Aşk-ı Memnu's popularity Beren Saat became the female sensation in Arab television which led to a generally higher viewership for Fatmagul.

Chile
Binbir Gece and Fatmagül'ün Suçu Ne? remain the two most watched Turkish shows in Chile.

International remake
 In India the show has been remade by Indian TV channel Star Plus in Hindi under the title of Kya Kasoor Hai Amla Ka. This is the first official remake of the series. The show aired from 3 April 2017 during the noon slot. The show features Pankhuri Awasthy as Amala (Fatmagul), Anant Joshi as Dev (Mustafa) and Rajveer Singh as Abeer (Kerim). The original show titled Fatmagul first aired on Zindagi TV and became a rating success and thus the remake was commissioned.
 A Spanish remake called Alba was released in 2021. The show stars Elena Rivera as Alba (Fatmagul).

References

External links
Official site
Kanal D series page
Fatmagül'ün Suçu Ne (2010)

2010 Turkish television series debuts
2012 Turkish television series endings
Turkish drama television series
Television series by Ay Yapım
Kanal D original programming
Rape in television
Television shows set in İzmir
Television shows set in Istanbul
Television series produced in Istanbul
Television series set in the 2010s